Miss Malaysia World 1992, the 26th edition of the Miss World Malaysia pageant was held on August 23, 1992, at the Hotel Crown Princess in Kuala Lumpur. Miss Malaysia World 1991, Samantha Schubert crowned her successor, Fazira Wan Chek from Kuala Lumpur at the end of the event. She then represented Malaysia at Miss World 1992 where she won Miss Talented award.

The winner received RM6000 while the runners-up received RM3000, RM2000, and RM1000 respectively. Morever, they also won sponsor gifts such as Kose Cosmetic sets, trophies, perfumes, casual wear and dresses, watches, Polignac products, glasses, VO5 hair care products, Pelco skin products and hairdressing services by Thomas & Guys.

State level competitions were held earlier between March and July. This edition featured 14 contestants, three from Penang, two from Johor, Kuala Lumpur, Melaka, Sarawak, and each one from Sabah, Selangor and Perak. 

Present were Malaysian politician Minister of Transport Dato Dr. Ling Liong Sik, Minister of Human Resources Dato Lim Ah Lek, and Minister of Culture, Arts and Tourism Dato Sabbaruddin Chik as well as Gemith Gonzalo Gemparo, Miss Philippines 1991.

Results

Special awards

Contestants

References 

Miss World
1992
1992 in Malaysia
1992 beauty pageants